TJ Družstevník Vrakúň or also FC DAC 1904 Dunajská Streda B is a Slovak association football club located in Vrakúň. It currently plays in Slovak IV. liga south-east. In Summer 2014 was renamed to FC DAC 1904 Dunajská Streda B and it became reserve team of FC DAC 1904 Dunajská Streda

Colors and badge 
Its colors are TBA.

References

External links
TJ Družstevník Vrakúň on DS Portal 

Football clubs in Slovakia